Edward Donough O'Brien, 14th Baron Inchiquin KP (14 May 1839 – 9 April 1900) was the holder of a hereditary peerage in the Peerage of Ireland, as well as Chief of the Name of O'Brien and Prince of Thomond in the Gaelic Irish nobility. In 1862, he was appointed High Sheriff of Clare.

Born the eldest son of Lucius O'Brien, 13th Baron Inchiquin and Mary Fitzgerald. He took the title in March 1872, upon the death of his father, and was appointed a Knight of the Order of St. Patrick on 5 August 1892. 

He married firstly Emily Holmes-á Court, the daughter of William Holmes-á Court, 2nd Baron Heytesbury, and together they had four children; Geraldine Mary O'Brien (1863-?), Lucius William O'Brien, 15th Baron Inchiquin (1864-1929), Lt.-Col. Murrough O'Brien (1866-1934), and Edward Donough O'Brien (1867-1943).

He then married Ellen Harriet, the daughter of Luke White, 2nd Baron Annaly, with whom he had a further ten children. One daughter, Beatrice, married Marquess Guglielmo Marconi, the radio pioneer.

References

1839 births
1900 deaths
19th-century Irish people
People from County Clare
Knights of St Patrick
Lord-Lieutenants of Clare
Edward
Irish representative peers
High Sheriffs of Clare
Barons Inchiquin
Irish chiefs of the name